Isothipendyl is a 1st generation H1 antagonist (antihistamine) and anticholinergic used as an antipruritic. It is nowadays scarcely used in the 1st line relief of allergies due to the anticholinergic side effect of somnolence but does have some limited use through topical application in the relief of insect bites and related itching (pruritus).

See also
 Promethazine
Prothipendyl

References 

H1 receptor antagonists
Pyridobenzthiazines